Black Velvet Flag was a New York City-based comedy music trio, known for their humorous, lounge-styled covers of songs by Southern California punk rock bands, and for performing while wearing tuxedos. They became known in 1994, after performing on the New York music scene, which suddenly propelled them to fame in just six months. Their only full-length album, Come Recline, was released in 1995 on Go-Kart Records. In 2003, an interactive documentary of the band, entitled The Rise and Fall of Black Velvet Flag, was released; it was directed by Sheldon Schiffer.

Reception
Black Velvet Flag was named the best unsigned band of 1994 by Rolling Stones poll of music critics.  AllMusic's Jack Rabid called the album "One of the funniest records released this year." In the Washington Post, Mark Jenkins wrote of the band's act of covering punk songs in a lounge style that "...this is a joke that doesn't need to be told more than once." Trouser Presss David Sprague concluded that the album "...falls somewhere between Dread Zeppelin feebdom and a '90s approximation of Frank Sinatra's late-'60s hipster era, during which Ol' Blue Eyes tried his best to bask in the glow of the summer of love — not that either assessment will keep Black Velvet Flag from the next century's thrift store bargain bins." Chris Norris of New York was also critical of the band's style, writing that their "hardcore-as-lounge gag" was "funny for about twenty seconds and only if you've never seen Repo Man."

Discography
Come Recline (Go-Kart, 1994)
Go-Kart vs. the Corporate Giant; Volume #1 (Go-Kart, 1996)

References

Musical groups from New York City
American musical trios
American comedy musical groups
Lounge music groups